Jorge Arraiza (born June 27, 1970 in San Juan, Puerto Rico) is a Puerto Rican musician most known for being the bassist of the Rock en Español band Fiel a la Vega.

Biography

Jorge Arraiza is one of the sons of Manuel Arraiza and Eneida González. When he was 12 years old, he received an acoustic guitar and, pressed by his brother José, develops an interest for the rhythm & blues. At this time, he also starts listening to The Who becoming a huge fan of John Entwistle whom he credits as his biggest influence.

In 1986, he formed a band with his cousin Milo called Crossroads. His intention was to play music of the 1960s and the 1970s, but singer Tito Auger wanted to focus on Top 40 hits. The band shortly disbanded and Arraiza kept on working with his brothers (José and Pedro) forming a band called Los Arraiza Voladores in 1989, also with cousin Milo.

In 1994, he reunited with Tito Auger and Ricky Laureano to form the band Fiel a la Vega. The band quickly achieved great success on the island releasing several radio hits and winning several awards.  

In 2010, Jorge graduated cooking school at Ana G Mendez University and has alternated between cooking jobs and gigs with Fiel a la Vega, as well as featuring with Good Acoustics (an acoustic cover band) with his brother Pedro. 

In 2016, Los Arraiza Voladores released their CD "Blues Gobierno y Otros Males Sociales" recorded and produced by Ricky Laurerano. 

In July 2020, Field a la Vega held a virtual concert with half a million viewers in attendance.

As of 2020, Fiel a la Vega has released five studio albums, three live albums (one acoustic, one symphonic, one electric) and two concert DVDs, as well as having filled every venue in the island.

See also
 Music in Puerto Rico
 Puerto Rican rock

References

External links
Fiel a la Vega Official site

1970 births
Living people
People from Vega Baja, Puerto Rico
Puerto Rican guitarists
Fiel a la Vega members
Musicians from San Juan, Puerto Rico